Gustavo Bontadini (27 March 1903 – 12 April 1990) was an Italian philosopher, writer, and a teacher. He was born in Milan and died in 1990, aged 87. Bontadini was also an influential representative known for Neo-Scholasticism in the 20th century. From 1951 to 1973, he became a professor of Theoretical philosophy in the Catholic university in Milan. He was also a teacher of Emanuele Severino, Angelo Scola and other Italian philosophers.

The Milan Catholic University great hall was named in honour of Bontadini. It was an ancient ice  house shaped a circle of 8 meters radius and located at a depth of 11 meters.

References

Further reading 
 Saggio di una metafisica dell'esperienza, Milano, Vita e pensiero, 1938.
 Studi sull'idealismo. Serie prima (1923–1935), Urbino, A. Argalia, 1942.
 Dall'attualismo al problematicismo. Studii sulla filosofia italiana contemporanea, Brescia, La scuola, 1945.
 Studi sulla filosofia dell'età cartesiana, Brescia, La scuola, stampa 1947.
 Dal problematicismo alla metafisica. Nuovi studi sulla filosofia italiana contemporanea, Milano, Marzorati, 1952.
 Indagini di struttura sul gnoseologismo moderno. I. Berkeley, Leibniz, Hume, Kant, Brescia, La scuola, 1952.
 Il compito della metafisica, Bontadini e altri, Milano, Fratelli Bocca, 1952.
 Studi di filosofia moderna, Brescia, La scuola, 1966.
 Conversazioni di metafisica, 2 voll., Milano, Vita e pensiero, 1971.
 Metafisica e deellenizzazione, Milano, Vita e pensiero, 1975.
 Appunti di filosofia, Milano, Vita e pensiero, 1996. 

1903 births
1990 deaths
20th-century Italian people
Italian Roman Catholics
Writers from Milan
20th-century Italian philosophers
Italian Freemasons